William Ratcliff is a 1922 Austrian silent film directed by Heinz Hanus and starring Oscar Beregi Sr., Hanna Ralph and Albert von Kersten.

Cast
 Oscar Beregi Sr. as Leo Dubois 
 Manja Keller
 Georg Kundert
 Hanna Ralph
 Annie Röttgen
 Armin Seydelmann
 Rudolf Sichra
 Else Strohlendorf
 Albert von Kersten

References

Bibliography
 Paolo Caneppele & Günter Krenn. Elektrische Schatten. Filmarchiv Austria, 1999.

External links

1922 films
Austrian silent feature films
Films directed by Heinz Hanus
Austrian black-and-white films
Films set in Scotland
Austrian films based on plays